Siemens Energy AG is an energy company formed by the spin off of the former Gas and Power division of Siemens Group and includes a 97.7% share of Siemens Gamesa.

Christian Bruch is CEO and the former CEO of Siemens AG Joe Kaeser is chairman of the supervisory board.

At an Extraordinary Shareholders' Meeting of Siemens AG on July 9, 2020, its shareholders approved the split-up of the company. Trading of the shares of the new Siemens Energy AG on the Frankfurt Stock Exchange began on September 28.

History 
The energy division has been an essential part of the company since the foundation of the group by Werner von Siemens and Johann Georg Halske. Important organizational milestones were the founding of Siemens-Schuckertwerke in 1903, the formation of the Power Engineering Division in 1969 in the newly founded Siemens AG, and the bundling of activities in the Siemens Energy Sector in 2008.

Siemens Energy was created as an independent company in April 2020 as a result of a renewed restructuring of the Siemens Group. Siemens transferred its energy division to the new independent company for this purpose.

Products 
The Group's product range mainly includes:

 Power transmission and distribution (for example, transformers, switchgear, high-voltage direct-current transmission)

 Generators

 Power plant technology

 Low-voltage switchgear: switchgear for load feeders, components for power distribution, control and signalling devices, complete cubicle systems (circuit breakers, etc.)

 Turbines: Wind turbines, steam and gas turbines

 Compressors

References 

Siemens
2020 establishments in Germany
2020 initial public offerings
Companies listed on the Frankfurt Stock Exchange
Energy companies established in 2020
Energy companies of Germany
Electronics companies of Germany
Corporate spin-offs
Companies formerly in the MDAX